Cornelia Hendrika "Corrie" Schimmel (born 29 April 1939) is a Dutch former swimmer who won a gold and silver medal at the 1958 European championships. Two years later she competed at the 1960 Summer Olympics and finished sevenths in the 400 m freestyle. Between 1957 and 1960 she won five national titles in the 400 m and 1500 m freestyle. In 1959–1960 she also set 10 European records in the 200–1500 m events.

References

1939 births
Living people
Dutch female freestyle swimmers
Olympic swimmers of the Netherlands
Swimmers at the 1960 Summer Olympics
People from Bussum
European Aquatics Championships medalists in swimming
Sportspeople from North Holland
20th-century Dutch women
20th-century Dutch people